Felipe Manoel Gonçalves (born 4 November 1989), known as Felipe Manoel or simply Felipe, is a Brazilian professional footballer who plays for Brusque as a central midfielder.

Football career
Born in São Paulo, Felipe Manoel was signed by Villarreal CF on 30 January 2008, still a youngster, from São Bernardo Futebol Clube. He was immediately loaned to Sport Club do Recife, until 30 June.

Felipe split the 2008–09 season in the Spanish second division, starting off at SD Huesca. In December 2008 he moved to Levante UD, and appeared only six times between the two teams combined.

Felipe Manoel spent the first months of the new campaign unregistered. In the 2010 January transfer window, however, he was assigned to Villarreal's reserves also in the second level. Later in the year, he returned to his country, signing a five-year contract with Sociedade Esportiva e Recreativa Caxias do Sul in division three but being released in November 2011.

Felipe subsequently resumed his career in the lower levels, representing Paysandu Sport Club, Futebol Clube Santa Cruz (two stints), Esporte Clube Novo Hamburgo, Associação Atlética Santa Cruz, Guaratinguetá Futebol, Nacional Futebol Clube and Rio Preto Esporte Clube.

On 29 June 2016, Felipe Manoel signed with Portuguese C.S. Marítimo, but he terminated his contract shortly after and returned to his country.

Honours

Sport Club Recife
Copa do Brasil: 2008
Campeonato Amazonense: 2015

References

External links

1989 births
Living people
Footballers from São Paulo
Brazilian footballers
Association football midfielders
Campeonato Brasileiro Série A players
Campeonato Brasileiro Série B players
Campeonato Brasileiro Série C players
Campeonato Brasileiro Série D players
Segunda División players
Brazilian expatriate footballers
Expatriate footballers in Spain
Expatriate footballers in Portugal
Brazilian expatriate sportspeople in Spain
São Bernardo Futebol Clube players
Villarreal CF players
Sport Club do Recife players
SD Huesca footballers
Levante UD footballers
Villarreal CF B players
Sociedade Esportiva e Recreativa Caxias do Sul players
Paysandu Sport Club players
Futebol Clube Santa Cruz players
Esporte Clube Novo Hamburgo players
Guaratinguetá Futebol players
Nacional Futebol Clube players
Rio Preto Esporte Clube players
C.S. Marítimo players
Clube Atlético Bragantino players
Sertãozinho Futebol Clube players
Esporte Clube São Bento players
Associação Portuguesa de Desportos players
América Futebol Clube (RN) players
Esporte Clube Avenida players
ABC Futebol Clube players